Pioltello-Limito is a railway station in Pioltello, Lombardy, Italy. The station opened in 1846 and is located on the Milan–Venice railway. The train services are operated by Trenord.

The station opened as Limito in 1846 and was renamed in 1908 to its current name.

In the early 2000s, with the quadrupling of the line and the launch of the suburban railway of Milan, the station was upgraded and expanded, becoming an interchange point between regional and suburban trains. The station also received a new passenger building, built next to the original one, dating from the construction of the line. The new passenger building was opened on 22 May 2011.

It became the location of the 25 January 2018 train derailment, which left two people dead and over 100 injured. Another, deadlier accident had taken place on November 28, 1893, with 40 people dead and 22 injured.

Train services
The station is served by the following service(s):

Express services (Treno regionale) Milan - Treviglio - Brescia - Verona
Express services (Treno regionale) Milan - Pioltello - Bergamo
Regional services (Treno regionale) Milan - Treviglio - Brescia
Milan Metropolitan services (S5) Varese - Rho - Milan - Treviglio
Milan Metropolitan services (S6) Novara - Rho - Milan - Treviglio

See also
Milan suburban railway network

References

External links

Railway stations in Lombardy
Railway stations opened in 1846
Milan S Lines stations
1846 establishments in the Austrian Empire
Railway stations in Italy opened in 1846
Pioltello